The United Kingdom Census 1961 was a census of the United Kingdom of Great Britain and Northern Ireland carried out on 23 April 1961. It was the first to ask about qualifications, migration status, and household tenure. It was also the first to use a computer, an IBM 705 at the Royal Army Pay Corps, Worthy Down, Winchester.

Release
The census was conducted under the Census Act 1920 which prohibits disclosure. It is expected, however, that it will be released to the public in the year 2062.

See also
Census in the United Kingdom
List of United Kingdom censuses

References

External links

Censuses in the United Kingdom
Census
Census
United Kingdom